The United States sent 56 athletes (45 men and 11 women) to the 2006 Winter Paralympics in Turin, Italy, the largest delegation of any nation. Chris Devlin-Young, a 15-year veteran of the U.S. Disabled Ski Team and four-time Paralympic medalist in alpine skiing, served as the flag bearer at the opening ceremonies. ice sledge hockey player Lonnie Hannah, a member of the gold-medal-winning U.S. team at the 2002 Winter Paralympics in Salt Lake City and the bronze-medal-winning team in Turin, was the flag bearer at the closing ceremonies.

The U.S. finished fifth in the gold and seventh in the overall medal count. While the United States' total medal count was down from the 2002 Winter Paralympics because the number of disability classes in both alpine and nordic skiing were significantly reduced, there were many standout U.S. performances. Steve Cook won three medals in nordic skiing, including gold in the men's standing category of the 5K and the 10K. In alpine skiing, Laurie Stephens won three medals in the women's sitting category, including gold in the downhill and super G, while in the men's downhill, Kevin Bramble won gold in the sitting category and his teammate Chris Devlin-Young took the silver. Allison Jones and Sandy Dukat won gold and bronze, respectively, in the women's standing category of the slalom. Stephani Victor was the gold medal winner in the women's sitting slalom. The U.S. sledge hockey team was unable to repeat its gold medal from the 2002 Winter Paralympics after losing 4–2 to Norway in the semifinals, but held on to win the bronze by beating Germany 4–3.

Medalists
American athletes won seven gold, two silver, and three bronze medals at the games. Laurie Stephens and Steve Cook both won multiple medals; Stephens took two golds and a silver in alpine skiing, and Cook won two golds and a bronze in cross-country skiing. In the 'by discipline' sections below, medalists' names are in bold.

Alpine skiing 

The United States sent 27 alpine skiers to the Games, 20 men and 7 women. The men's team took home two medals, a gold and a silver won by Kevin Bramble and Christopher Devlin-Young, respectively, in the downhill sitting event. The women won six medals, including two in the slalom standing event: a gold won by Allison Jones and a bronze by Sandy Dukat. Laurie Stephens was the alpine skiing team's most prolific medalist, with two golds and one silver.

 Men

 Women

Key: DNF=Did not finish; DNS=Did not start

Biathlon 

The U.S. Paralympic biathlon team consisted of two women and one man. All three of these athletes also competed in cross-country skiing events at the Games. The highest placed finisher was Kelly Underkofler, who took fourth in the women's 12.5 km standing event.

Cross-country skiing 

Nordic skiing: 3 women, 6 men

Women:
 Monica Bascio (36, Evergreen, Colorado)
 Candace Cable (51, Truckee, California)
 Kelly Underkofler (21, St. Paul, Minnesota/Frisco, Colorado)

Men:
 Bob Balk (40, Long Beach, California)
 Steven Cook (37, Salt Lake City)
 Mike Crenshaw (51, Boulder, Colorado)
 Chris Klebl (34, Heber City, Utah)
 Greg Mallory (37, Portland, Oregon)
 Dan Perkins (47, Syracuse, New York)

Ice sledge hockey 

Ice sledge hockey: 15 men
 Steven Cash (16, Overland, Missouri)
 Taylor Chace (19, Hampton Falls, New Hampshire)
 Dave Conklin (50, La Crosse, Wisconsin)
 James Connelly (16, Galloway, New Jersey)
 Brad Emmerson (20, Amherst, New York)
 Manuel Guerra, Jr (38, Plymouth, Minnesota)
 Michael Hallman (16, Hatboro, Pennsylvania)
 Lonnie Hannah II (42, Mansfield, Texas)
 Joseph Howard (39, Kingston, Massachusetts)
 Tim Jones (18, Mount Ephraim, New Jersey)
 Andrew Lipsett (19, Mesquite, Texas)
 Christopher Manns (25, Buffalo, New York)
 Alexi Salamone (18, Grand Island, New York)
 Kip St. Germaine (40, East Falmouth, Massachusetts)
 Andy Yohe (27, Bettendorf, Iowa)

Wheelchair curling 

Wheelchair curling: 1 woman, 4 men

Women:
 Danell Libby (37, Chatham, New York)

Men:
 James Joseph (44, New Hartford, New York)
 Augusto Perez (33, East Syracuse, New York)
 Jim Pierce (43, North Syracuse, New York)
 Wes Smith (65, Glenburn, Maine)

The youngest member of the 2006 United States Paralympic Team was James Connelly (ice sledge hockey; bronze), at the age of 16 years and 4 months. He was a rookie defenseman on the bronze medal-winning ice sledge hockey team, making him the United States' youngest winter medal-holding Paralympian in history.

See also
 United States at the 2006 Winter Olympics

References

External links
 Official Torino 2006 Paralympic Games Website, archived on August 29, 2006
 International Paralympic Committee official website
 U.S. Paralympics official website

Nations at the 2006 Winter Paralympics
2006 Winter Paralympics
Winter Paralympics